Stephen of Ephesus (448–451) was a bishop of Ephesus, an attendee of the Second Council of Ephesus and the Council of Chalcedon. Some argue that he is the author of the Seven Sleepers of Ephesus.

Early life
Stephen became a presbyter in the city of Ephesus about 400 AD and then bishop in 448 AD. He was a staunch rival of his predecessor Bassianus.

Council of Ephesus
Stephen of Ephesus supported Dioscorus at the Robber Council of 449. Dioscorus followed the heresy of Eutyches. For this Stephen and another bishop in Ephesus were deposed as bishop.

Stephen then sought to depose his rival Bassianus from the cathedra of Ephesus in 444 AD but Theodosius II deferred the dispute to the Council of Chalcedon, which deprived both bishops of their see.

Council of Chalcedon
Stephen addressed the Council of Chalcedon, though his reputation was sorely questioned by the Council. Stephen was closely examined on his role at the Council of Ephesus and asked to provide records of the discussions there. He replied that he signed the Council document under duress and that records were not preserved. The Council did not accept his defenses.

Bassianus and Stephen were then both retired on a pension with episcopal dignity, the council having found the behavior of both bishops unworthy of their seat.

During his career, Stephen was allied with Flavian of Constantinople.

Seven Sleepers of Ephesus
Stephen is also the first recorded source of the Seven Sleepers of Ephesus, a tale best known through its adaptation into the Quran. While some see the story as based in a genuine conviction of the time, other modern scholars have claimed Stephen used the seven sleepers legend to increase the presage of the bishopric in Ephesus.

References

5th-century Byzantine bishops
Year of birth unknown
Year of death unknown
Bishops of Ephesus
Ancient Ephesians